Bir Bara Ban Wildlife Sanctuary is situated 5 km away from Jind on Jind-hansi Road in Haryana State, India. It is spread over an area of 419.26 hectares.

Here you can find various species of animal and birds and reptiles such as rhesus monkey, jackal, wild dogs, wild cows, neel cows, badger, wild cats in list of animals and humming bird, peacock, hornbill, Eagle, kites and many other species of birds.

Location
It is 5 km away from Jind, 40 km from Hansi, 70 km from Hisar, 73 km from Panipat, 80 km from Bhiwani, 110 km from Kurukshetra, 144 km from Delhi and 190 km from Chandigarh.

History
Haryana govt notified this area as sanctuary on 11 October 2007.

External links 
 List of National Parks, State Wild Life Sanctuaries, Zoos and Parks in Haryana

References 

Wildlife sanctuaries in Haryana
Villages in Panchkula district
2007 establishments in Haryana
Protected areas established in 2007